Spittler is a German surname. Notable people with the surname include:

 Kerstin Spittler (born 1963), East German rower
 Ludwig Timotheus Spittler (1752–1810), German historian
 Torsten Spittler (born 1962), German football manager

See also
 Spitler, surname
 Spittle (surname)

German-language surnames